Carlo Cokxxx Nutten II is a collaboration album between the German rappers Bushido (a.k.a. Sonny Black) and Baba Saad, released in 2005. It is a follow-up to 2002's Carlo Cokxxx Nutten.

Background 
Bushido had planned a follow-up to Carlo Cokxxx Nutten, which he had recorded with Fler. Because of the feud between Bushido and Fler, Baba Saad replaced him.

Bushido used the pseudonym "Sonny Black" again, like he did on the preceding album, where Fler had used the pseudonym "Frank White".
Bushido entirely produced the album's beats, which contain samples of the band Arcana.

On 24 February 2006, a Ltd. Pur Edition of the album was released.

Track listing
Bushido produced the whole album, except track 1 ("Intro"), which was produced by DJ Ilan.

Samples
"Denk an mich" contains a sample of "The Windy Shore" by Iridio
"Ghettorap hin, Ghettorap her" contains a sample of "Wind of the Lost Souls" by Arcana
"Sonny Black" contains a sample of "March of Loss" by Arcana
"Nie ein Rapper" contains a sample of "Innocent Child" by Arcana
"Also komm..." contains a sample of "We Rise Above" by Arcana
"Träume im Dunkeln" contains a sample of "Fade Away" by Arcana
"Besoffene Kinder" contains a sample of "Sono La Salva" by Arcana
"Es tut mir leid" contains a sample of "Abschied" by Sopor Aeternus & The Ensemble of Shadows
"Taliban" contains a sample of "Lament" by Arcana

Personnel 

Artwork by Dirk Rudolph
Lyrics by Bushido (tracks 2–5 and 7–15), D-Bo (track 10), and Baba Saad (tracks 2–6 and 8–15)
Mastered by Bommer
Mixed and recorded by DJ Ilan
Photography by Kasskara

References 

2005 albums
Bushido (rapper) albums
Baba Saad albums
Collaborative albums
German-language albums